Kiku Park is a  public park in Troutdale, Oregon, United States.

Dedicated in 1983, the park features a basketball court and a playground most recently upgraded in 2021. In 2017, bat boxes were installed in the park in an effort to control the mosquito population.

References

External links

 

Parks in Multnomah County, Oregon
Troutdale, Oregon